Fernando Miranda (born May 16, 1979), who goes by Fern and sometimes FERN, F.E.R.N. or Fernie, is a Puerto Rican rapper in the Christian hip hop genre. He is part of the duo Social Club Misfits, together with his partner, Marty Mar. His first EP, 68 and Douglas, was released in 2015. This was his breakthrough release upon the Billboard magazine charts.

Early life
Fern was born as Fernando Miranda on May 16, 1979, and he was raised in Miami, Florida, where he and Marty established Social Club.

Music career
Fern's solo music recording career started in 2015, with the EP 68 and Douglas, which was released on December 4, 2015, by Social Club. The EP was his breakthrough release upon the Billboard magazine charts, where it placed on four charts, while it peaked at No. 15 on Christian Albums, No. 21 on Independent Albums, No. 19 on Rap Albums, and No. 5 on Heatseekers Albums.

Film career
In 2017, Fern announced that he was to appear in the film Canal Street. The film was released in 2018.

Discography

EPs

Mixtapes and Compilations

References

1979 births
Living people
American performers of Christian hip hop music
Musicians from Miami
Rappers from Miami
21st-century American rappers